San Manuel is a census-designated place (CDP) in Pinal County, Arizona, United States. The population was 3,551 at the 2010 census.

San Manuel was built in 1953 by Del E. Webb Construction Company as a company town to serve the then-new San Manuel copper mine, mill and smelter complex. In 1955 the San Manuel Arizona Railroad was built to connect with the Copper Basin Railway at Hayden. When copper prices fell in the late 1990s, BHP, the owner of the mine and smelter complex shuttered both operations in June 1999.  The closing saw 2,500 people lose their jobs. The mine and smelter were permanently closed in 2003.

The community is on the edge of the Sonoran Desert with its saguaros and overlooks the San Pedro River valley and panoramic Galiuro Mountains. Today, San Manuel is a leisure destination popular for hunting, sightseeing, and is a hub for off-road adventure for dirt bikes, UTV's and ATV's. UTV rentals and guided tours are available in town. Several museums include a mining museum and a motorcycle museum. It is also a gateway city of The Arizona Trail.  Nearby towns are Oracle and Mammoth. Both are within  of San Manuel and make up a tri-community area.

Geography

According to the United States Census Bureau, the CDP has a total area of  all  land.

Airport
San Manuel Airport – E77 known as San Manuel Ray Blair Airport is public and located  NW of San Manuel, Arizona.

Local & area attractions
JWJ Cycles, motorcycle museum
San Manuel Museum, developed and operated by the San Manuel Historical Society. Mining history.
Arizona Trail, located just west of San Manuel
Peppersauce Cave, primitive cave

Events
San Manuel Copper Classic, annual off-road motorcycle race in March hosted by The Trail Riders of Southern Arizona
Copper Town Days, annual event in San Manuel the second Saturday in October with a car show, food and entertainment
San Manuel Chili Cook-Off, music, games, vendors and taste testing
Santa Catalina Weekend, bicycle races

Demographics

As of the census of 2000, there were 4,375 people, 1,458 households, and 1,204 families residing in the CDP. The racial makeup of the CDP was 69.1% White, 0.4% Black or African American, 1.4% Native American, 0.3% Asian, 0.1% Pacific Islander, 24.8% from other races, and 4.0% from two or more races.  46.2% of the population were Hispanic or Latino of any race.

There were 1,458 households, out of which 43.1% had children under the age of 18 living with them, 66.3% were married couples living together, 10.6% had a female householder with no husband present, and 17.4% were non-families. 15.0% of all households were made up of individuals, and 6.7% had someone living alone who was 65 years of age or older.  The average household size was 3.00 and the average family size was 3.31.

In the CDP, the population was spread out, with 32.6% under the age of 18, 8.8% from 18 to 24, 27.0% from 25 to 44, 21.1% from 45 to 64, and 10.5% who were 65 years of age or older.  The median age was 32 years. For every 100 females, there were 102.5 males.  For every 100 females age 18 and over, there were 98.1 males.

The median income for a household in the CDP was $40,019, and the median income for a family was $42,563. Males had a median income of $36,463 versus $21,304 for females. The per capita income for the CDP was $16,534.  About 10.3% of families and 12.8% of the population were below the poverty line, including 18.4% of those under age 18 and 5.6% of those age 65 or over.

References

External links
San Manuel, Arizona – Tourism Guide
Peppersauce Motorsports & Rentals – UTV Rentals & Tours
JWJ Cycles - Motorcycle Museum
Annual Chili Cook-off

Census-designated places in Pinal County, Arizona
Company towns in Arizona
Populated places in the San Pedro Valley (Arizona)
Populated places established in 1953
Mining communities in Arizona